Golden Yeggs is a 1950 Warner Bros. Merrie Melodies short directed by Friz Freleng. The cartoon was released on August 5, 1950, and stars Daffy Duck and Porky Pig. A forerunner of the Rocky and Mugsy characters appear, with Rocky already in his present-day form.

The story was written by Tedd Pierce and animated by Arthur Davis, Gerry Chiniquy, Ken Champin, Virgil Ross and Emery Hawkins. Paul Julian painted the backgrounds and Hawley Pratt designed the layouts. Mel Blanc provided the voices and Carl W. Stalling the music.

"Yegg" is a slang term for a burglar or safecracker. The same play-on-words was used in the title of the 1947 Bugs Bunny cartoon, Easter Yeggs. It is also a film noir parody.

Plot 
When Porky finds a golden egg in his henhouse, a goose reveals to the audience that he laid it. However, knowing full well what happened to the goose that laid the golden egg (a reference to Aesop's Fables), the goose tells Porky that Daffy is responsible. After reading about how much Daffy is worth, Rocky and his gang strong-arm Porky and 'talk him into' selling the duck to them. They hustle Daffy back to their den where Rocky demands he lay a golden egg. Daffy tries to stall for time, at one point asking for surroundings that would make him more comfortable. Rocky and his henchmen oblige, but when Daffy tries to get out of providing the egg, they shoot him out of the nice pool he has been enjoying and take him back to their hideout.

Daffy is given five minutes to lay the egg, or else. The duck insists on privacy, then tries various ways to escape his predicament, but is stopped at every turn. When time runs out, Rocky fires his gun at Daffy's head. The extreme stress results in him actually laying a golden egg.

Relieved he is now free to go, Daffy prances toward the door.  Rocky holds him up, points into a room containing dozens of empty egg crates and orders the duck to fill them.  Daffy groans, "Oh, my achin' back" and faints.

Alternative ending 
When this cartoon was used in The Looney Looney Looney Bugs Bunny Movie, a new ending was used. Instead of Daffy fainting, Bugs Bunny, alias Elegant Mess (a parody of Eliot Ness), arrives with the police to bust Rocky and his gang.  Daffy is exhausted by carrying out Rocky's orders. Naturally, Rocky and his gang are arrested. Daffy is taken to a hospital on a stretcher. Bugs asks Daffy if he needs anything and Daffy requests a proctologist, immediately.

References

External links 
 
 

1950 animated films
1950 short films
1950 films
Merrie Melodies short films
Short films directed by Friz Freleng
Daffy Duck films
Porky Pig films
Films scored by Carl Stalling
1950s Warner Bros. animated short films
1950s English-language films
Film noir cartoons
Rocky and Mugsy films